Dark Harvest is a 2004 American slasher film, written and directed by Paul Moore.

Plot

The movie takes place in the summer of 2002 when Sean (Don Digiulio) inherits a farmhouse from his father. Sean was adopted at birth and until that point had no idea about his family. He and a group of friends decide to stay in the farmhouse located in West Virginia for a few days. When they arrive, they're attacked by three killer scarecrows.

Main cast

Production and release

The film, which was released directly to video, was shot with a low budget and in only two and a half weeks. It was followed by two unrelated sequels, Dark Harvest II: The Maize and The Maize 2: Forever Yours.

References

External links

 

2004 direct-to-video films
2004 horror films
American slasher films
Films set in 2002
Films set in West Virginia
2004 films
American films about revenge
LGBT-related horror films
Bisexuality-related films
American supernatural horror films
American zombie films
2000s slasher films
Films about Satanism
Films set on farms
Fictional scarecrows
American exploitation films
American splatter films
2000s English-language films
2000s American films